Ostap Vyshnia (real name Pavlo Hubenko,  – 28 September 1956) was a Ukrainian writer, humourist, satirist, and medical official (feldsher). Nicknamed by many critics as the Ukrainian Mark Twain and the Ukrainian Printing King; His fame was said to have competed in early Soviet Ukraine only two: Taras Shevchenko and Vladimir Lenin.

Early life

Today his place is in Sumy Oblast while Zinkiv is a city in Poltava Oblast, both in Ukraine. He studied in elementary school in Zinkiv, later enrolling into the Kyiv military-nursing school which he finished in 1907. He worked as a nurse in the Army and then at the surgical department of the South-Western Railways hospital. He finally managed to take the tests to enroll into the Kyiv University in 1917, but later (1919) dropped out of it and was fully was overtaken by journalism and literary works. In 1919 he was captured by Bolsheviks while being in the Ukrainian Army and heavily sick of typhus. Remarkable is the fact that he also served as the chief of the medical-sanitary directorate of Ukrainian Ministry of Railways (Transport). Until 1921 he spent time in Kharkiv's prison till the complete end of the Civil War. During the times of Directorate of Ukraine he became known for his phrase: Inside the wagon - Directory, under the wagon - territory. In 1933, he was sentenced to 10 years in a forced labour camp. Vyshnia was one of the few representatives of the Renaissance group who survived the execution.

Career and repression

Hubenko's first published work, Denikin's Democratic Reforms, appeared on 2 November 1919 in the newspaper Narodna Volia under the pen name P. Hrunsky.

Several satirical articles were also printed in this same newspaper by the young writer. His period of regular publication began in April 1921, when he became a journalist with the government newspaper News of the All-Ukrainian Central Executive Committee. The pen name Ostap Vyshnia first appeared in The Peasant Truth on 22 July 1921, in the feuilleton Odd Fellow, Really!.

In 1933 he was sent to the labour camps for ten years, and he was able to return to his literary career only in 1943. He was rehabilitated in 1955.

Death
Ostap Vyshnya died on 28 September 1956 in Kyiv. His funeral reportedly filled Khreshchatyk street. He is buried at the Baikove Cemetery.

Works
Hard Times (translation into English of best humour & satire spanning his whole career), published 1981, transl. by Yuri Tkacz, Bayda Books, Australia

References

External links
 Yurkova, O.V. Ostap Vyshnia (ВИШНЯ Остап). Encyclopedia of History of Ukraine.
 Koshelivets, I. ''Vyshnia, Ostap. Encyclopedia of Ukraine.

1889 births
1956 deaths
Kiev Military Medical School alumni
Taras Shevchenko National University of Kyiv alumni
Ukrainian writers
Soviet writers
People from Sumy Oblast
People from Poltava Governorate
Ukrainian people of the Ukrainian–Soviet War
Gulag detainees
Ukrainian male writers
Burials at Baikove Cemetery
20th-century male writers